Busted! is a South Korean streaming television program on Netflix starring Yoo Jae-suk, Ahn Jae-wook, Kim Jong-min, Lee Kwang-soo, Park Min-young, Oh Se-hun, Kim Se-jeong and Lee Seung-gi. It premiered on May 4, 2018, and concluded on January 22, 2021.

The program is a Netflix Original that is co-produced with SangSang Company, a Korean production company that is responsible for X-Man, Running Man, and Family Outing. The show is Netflix's first original program to showcase an all-Korean cast. During a press briefing, producer Cho Hyo-jin mentioned that Netflix's goal is to create a hit show for South Korea, which can then be "consumed on the global stage". The show mixes both scripted and unscripted lines.

The first season consists of 10 episodes; two episodes a week were released from May 4 to June 1, 2018. On May 30, 2018, Netflix published a press release announcing the program had been renewed for a second season. All ten episodes were released on November 8, 2019. On February 16, 2020, the show was renewed for a third season. Similar to second season, all eight episodes were released on January 22, 2021. Two weeks prior to the premiere of the third season, it was announced that the latter would conclude the show.

Synopsis

Season 1
Seven celebrity sleuths discover that they are a part of an operation called Project D, in which they are implanted with a chip containing the DNA of famous detectives throughout history. Led by a man only known as "K" (Ahn Nae-sang), they are recruited as private detectives and are given a new case in each episode, all the while gradually uncovering the mystery behind Project D and its inception.

Season 2
One year after the incidents of Season 1, the detectives reunite along with a new recruit to unveil the truth of K's death. With different murder cases that are interconnected, they conclude to search for the serial killer named "Flower Killer".

Cast

Episodes
Each episode features guest celebrities. Unlike other Korean variety show formats, guests for Busted! play characters many of whom have the same names as the celebrities themselves. The characters are somehow involved in the murder mystery in each episode and/or lead the cast to clues for solving the murder mystery.

Series overview

Season 1 (2018)

Season 2 (2019)

Season 3 (2021)

Development and production
Cho Hyo-jin, one of the executive producers of Busted!, stated that he and the other producers pitched a variety show to Netflix where ordinary people can become detectives and solve cases, and Netflix liked the concept. The initial title for the show was "Dumb and Dumber Detective".

Season 1
On September 27, 2017, it was reported that the final lineup for the show would consist of Yoo Jae-suk, Ahn Jae-wook, Kim Jong-min, Lee Kwang-soo, Park Min-young, EXO's Oh Se-hun, and Gugudan's Kim Se-jeong. According to Cho, Lee Kwang-soo and Kim Jong-min were added to the cast to highlight the "dumb and dumber" aspect of the show, while Ahn Jae-wook and Park Min-young were added due to their serious personalities.

Filming for Busted! began on September 27, 2017, with Yoo Yeon-seok being confirmed as the show's first guest. The show was initially set to be released in March 2018. The first two episodes premiered on Netflix on May 4, 2018.

Season 2
On May 30, 2018, Netflix renewed the show for a second season. On September 6, 2018, it was reported that the original cast would return for the second season, apart from Lee Kwang-soo who would not be joining due to scheduling conflicts. In a Netflix event held in November 2018, producer Jang Hyuk-jae announced that Lee Seung-gi would join the cast. Netflix announced that the second season was scheduled to premiere on November 8, 2019.

The episodes are shorter than the first season because "although some of the viewers liked the show's length because it felt like watching a movie, others said that the episodes were too long" according to producer Kim Dong-jin. There are also several fixed guests who appear multiple times during the season and who play a more important role than in the first season.

Due to his drunk driving incident in February 2019, Ahn Jae-wook did not promote the second season with the rest of the cast. He was removed from the opening credits and did not appear on the promotional posters.

Season 3
On January 17, 2020, it was reported that Lee Kwang-soo was in talks to return for the third season of the show. On February 16, 2020, Busted! was officially renewed for a third season. Filming began in April and ended in early June. The release date was teased on Instagram by the cast on December 14–16, with the season premiere of January 22, 2021 being officially confirmed by Netflix on December 17. On January 19, the cast and producer Cho Hyo-jin held an online media conference to promote the final season.

Accolades

References

External links
 
 

Korean-language Netflix original programming
South Korean variety television shows
South Korean mystery television series
2010s South Korean television series
2018 South Korean television series debuts
2021 South Korean television series endings
Improvisational television series